Francis James Mathew, 2nd Earl Landaff KP (20 January 1768 – 12 March 1833), styled The Honourable Francis Mathew from 1783 to 1797 and Viscount Mathew from 1797 to 1806, was an Irish peer and politician.

Mathew sat for Tipperary in the Irish House of Commons from 1790 to 1792, when his election was declared invalid. He represented Callan between May and November 1796 and subsequently again Tipperary in the Irish House of Commons until the Act of Union in 1800 and then the United Kingdom House of Commons from 1801 until he succeeded his father in the earldom in 1806. His younger brother Montague James Mathew (1773–1819) succeeded him as one of the two members of the UK parliament for County Tipperary. He was an opponent of the Union and a supporter of Catholic Emancipation, and was also "a personal enemy of George IV" and gave evidence in favour of Queen Caroline regarding her conduct at the Court of Naples during her famous trial.

He was appointed a Knight of the Order of St Patrick on 24 November 1831.

Lord Landaff married Gertrude Cecilia, a daughter of John La Touche, of Kildare. The marriage was childless. He died of syncope in Dublin on 12 March 1833, aged 65, when the titles became extinct. Dying intestate, his estates went to his sister, Lady Elizabeth Mathew, who died in 1842 leaving the fortune to a cousin, the Vicomte de Chabot, the son of her mother's sister Elizabeth Smyth.

References

|-

1768 births
1833 deaths
2
Mathew, Francis
Mathew, Francis Mathew, Viscount
Knights of St Patrick
Francis
Mathew, Francis Mathew, Viscount
Mathew, Francis Mathew, Viscount
Mathew, Francis Mathew, Viscount
Mathew, Francis Mathew, Viscount
UK MPs who inherited peerages
Members of the Parliament of Ireland (pre-1801) for County Kilkenny constituencies